The Church of Jesus Christ of Latter-day Saints in Colorado refers to the Church of Jesus Christ of Latter-day Saints (LDS Church) and its members in Colorado. The first congregation of the Church in Colorado was organized in 1897. It has since grown to 149,007 members in 314 congregations.

Official church membership as a percentage of general population was 2.82% in 2014. According to the 2014 Pew Forum on Religion & Public Life survey 2% of Coloradans self-identify themselves most closely with The Church of Jesus Christ of Latter-day Saints. The LDS Church is the 2nd largest denomination in Colorado behind the Roman Catholic Church. Colorado has the 10th most members of the LDS Church in the United States.

History

On August 7, 1846, a settlement of 61 recent converts of the church traveling from Mississippi made camp on the Arkansas River, just east of present-day Pueblo in the southern part of the state. They had come along the main Overland trail to Fort Laramie but discovered the first groups of Mormon Pioneers from Nauvoo had stopped for the winter at Council Bluffs. Rather than turn back to join them; a trapper named John Renshaw led them down to a small adobe trading fort called El Pueblo which was thought to be a more suitable place to spend the winter. They made their camp about a half-mile south of El Pueblo.

While encamped in Pueblo the settlement was also joined by 3 different groups of the Mormon Battalion arriving between September 1846 and January 27, 1847. With the arrival in January, the population of the colony reached 289 people. This temporary colony was the first branch of The Church of Jesus Christ of Latter-day Saints in Colorado. The settlement is also widely believed to be the first Anglo settlement in what is now the state of Colorado. The settlement also was the home of the first Anglo born child in Colorado; Sarah Emma Kartchner.

In April 1847, the first members of the settlement began their trek north to Fort Laramie where they were waiting when Brigham Young arrives in June 1847. By the fall of 1848, all the members of the church had left the Pueblo settlement.

The first mission was established in the area in 1896 and the first congregation of the LDS Church in Colorado was organized in January 1897.

The Denver Colorado Temple in Centennial was completed in 1986.

The Fort Collins Colorado Temple was formally dedicated by Dieter F. Uchtdorf on October 16, 2016.

County Statistics

List of LDS Church adherents in each county as of 2010 according to the Association of Religion Data Archives: Note: Each county adherent count reflects meetinghouse location of congregation and not by location of residence. Census count reflects location of residence which may skew percent of population where adherents reside in a different county as their congregational meetinghouse.

Missions

The Colorado Mission was opened on December 15, 1896, with John W. Taylor as president. This mission was renamed the Western States Mission on April 1, 1907, then the Colorado-New Mexico Mission on June 10, 1970, then the Colorado Mission on October 10, 1972, and the Colorado Denver Mission on June 20, 1974.  It was finally renamed the Colorado Denver South Mission on July 1, 1993, upon creation of the Colorado Denver North Mission.

Colorado now contains four missions.

The southwestern portion of the state is located in the New Mexico Farmington Mission.

Temples
On October 24, 1986, the Denver Colorado Temple was dedicated by President Ezra Taft Benson.  On April 2, 2011, the Fort Collins Colorado Temple was announced. Western portions of Colorado are in the Vernal Utah Temple and Monticello Utah Temple districts. Southern portions of Colorado are in the Albuquerque New Mexico Temple district.

Communities 
Latter-day Saints have had a significant role in establishing and settling communities within the "Mormon Corridor", including the following located in Colorado:

La Jara
Manassa
Sanford

See also

 The Church of Jesus Christ of Latter-day Saints membership statistics (United States)
 Conejos County, Colorado: Religious history
 Pueblo, Colorado, where the sick detachments of the Mormon Battalion wintered in 1846-1847

References

Further reading

.

.

External links
 Newsroom (Colorado)
 ComeUntoChrist.org Latter-day Saints Visitor site
 The Church of Jesus Christ of Latter-day Saints Official site

Latter Day Saint movement in Colorado
Colorado